Fusitriton is a genus of large predatory sea snails marine gastropod molluscs in the family Cymatiidae.

Species 
Species within the genus Fusitroton include:
 Fusitriton brasiliensis Cossignani & Cossignani, 2003
 Fusitriton galea Kuroda & Habe, 1961
 Fusitriton glassi Swinnen, 2019
 Fusitriton laudandus Finlay, 1926
 Fusitriton magellanicus (Röding, 1798)
 Fusitriton oregonensis (Redfield, 1846)
 Fusitriton retiolus (Hedley, 1914)
 Fusitriton takedai Habe, 1979
Species brought into synonymy
 Fusitriton algoensis Tomlin, 1947: synonym of Fusitriton murrayi (E. A. Smith, 1891): synonym of Fusitriton magellanicus (Röding, 1798) (synonym)
 Fusitriton antarcticus Powell, 1958: synonym of Antarctoneptunea aurora (Hedley, 1916)
 Fusitriton aurora Hedley, 1916: synonym of Antarctoneptunea aurora (Hedley, 1916) (original combination)
 Fusitriton futuristi Mestayer, 1927: synonym of Fusitriton laudandus Finlay, 1926 (synonym)
 Fusitriton midwayensis Habe & Okutani, 1968: synonym of Sassia midwayensis (Habe & Okutani, 1968) (original combination)
 Fusitriton murrayi (E. A. Smith, 1891): synonym of Fusitriton magellanicus (Röding, 1798)

References

Cymatiidae